CIVT-DT (channel 32) is a television station in Vancouver, British Columbia, Canada, serving as the West Coast flagship of the CTV Television Network. It is owned and operated by network parent Bell Media alongside Victoria-based CTV 2 station CIVI-DT, channel 53 (although the two stations maintain separate operations). CIVT-DT's studios are located at 969 Robson Street (alternatively known as 750 Burrard Street; the former site of the Vancouver Public Library's central branch) at the intersection of Robson Street and Burrard Street in downtown Vancouver, which also houses the British Columbia operations of the CTV network itself, including the CTV National News Vancouver bureau. The station's transmitter is located atop Mount Seymour in the district municipality of North Vancouver.

CIVT went on the air in 1997 as the first new Vancouver TV station in 21 years after the application of Baton Broadcasting for a television licence was granted from a field of five bids. Originally known as Vancouver Television (VTV), the station was a young-skewing outlet intended to reflect an increasingly multicultural Vancouver and stimulate television production in British Columbia. In addition to local news and arts programming, CIVT produced programs seen nationally, including a talk show hosted by Vicki Gabereau and Cold Squad.

Concurrently with the launch of CIVT, Baton Broadcasting acquired the CTV network. This purchase, plus an ownership change at longtime CTV affiliate CHAN-TV that saw it become owned by the Global Television Network, led to a major television realignment in 2001 under which CIVT became the new CTV station for the province and the only CTV affiliate on Canada's west coast. In switching to CTV, the station moved toward attracting an older audience. It also improved its news ratings, generally becoming the second-rated station for local news after CHAN.

History

Licensing
By the mid-1990s, nearly two decades had passed since Vancouver had last received a new television station—CKVU-TV in 1976. A 1977 CRTC study found that, under its projections, Vancouver would need seven additional TV stations by 2001, including three new English-language commercial outlets as well as a multilingual station focused on ethnic communities in the region. While population growth had largely followed the CRTC's projections from that time, the growth in the television station industry had not. The three existing major stations in Vancouver—CBC station CBUT-TV, CHAN-TV (known as BCTV), and CKVU-TV—were coming under increasing scrutiny as being not adequately reflective of an increasingly diverse community. In a July 1996 column, Robert Mason Lee of The Globe and Mail noted that BCTV had the "dangerous arrogance of a local-news gorilla", called CBUT's news product "wholesome" but noted that the local CBC station "has neither the money nor the authority to produce local television", and labeled CKVU as "deplorable", "paving the road to hell", and "cheap and undeserving of Vancouver". There was also a decided sentiment in the growing British Columbia film and television production community that there were no decision-making entities in Vancouver. Producers in British Columbia derided the "$1,500 cup of coffee"—the meetings, complete with airfare, that Vancouver creatives had to make with Toronto leaders to get approval for their proposals.

The process that led to the launch of CIVT began when Rogers Communications and CanWest Global Communications filed separate applications with the Canadian Radio-television and Telecommunications Commission (CRTC) in August 1995 and January 1996, respectively, to launch new television stations in the Vancouver–Victoria market. In line with the commission's usual practice, the CRTC issued a general call for applications in March 1996, with a public hearing that September. In all, five applications were considered:
 Rogers proposed a multicultural station on channel 32—similar to its CFMT-TV in Toronto—to be known as "CFMV" and to replace an existing regional specialty channel, Talentvision. Sixty percent of the programs on CFMV would be in Asian languages. However, several Korean Canadians protested the Rogers bid because, in converting from a specialty channel to a broadcast service, Rogers proposed to cut Korean output from 14 hours a week to just 30 minutes.
 CanWest, then-owner of what is now the Global Television Network, proposed a new station in Victoria, in parallel to its existing Vancouver station CKVU-TV (channel 10), purportedly to gain parity with the market's existing twinstick of CHAN-TV (channel 8) and CHEK-TV (channel 6)—together known as BCTV—under the ownership of Western International Communications (WIC). This service, VITV ("Vancouver Island Television"), would have had transmitters in Victoria and Courtenay.
 Three other companies each proposed to launch a new, local independent station focused on Vancouver:
 The Baton/Electrohome Alliance (a partnership between two of the largest CTV affiliate owners) proposed CIVT-TV on channel 42, focusing on providing a more diverse view of the city and 12.5 hours a week of local news coverage.
 CHUM Limited (owner of Toronto's CITY-TV), would have started Vtv ("Vancouver Television") on transmitters in Vancouver (channel 32) and Victoria (channel 29), promising to duplicate the Citytv formula on the West Coast. In a move called unprecedented, sitting BC premier Glen Clark endorsed the CHUM application.
 Craig Broadcast Systems (owner of two stations in Manitoba and shortly thereafter licensed to launch two more in Alberta) sought to start a service to be known as "Very Independent Television" (VITV), also broadcast on UHF in Vancouver and Victoria, complete with a multilingual news service producing English, Mandarin, and Punjabi-language news programs (with the latter two in the dinner hour) as well as a nightly entertainment show named Yaletown.

The commission's decision, released on January 31, 1997, approved the Baton/Electrohome application and denied the others. The prospective Rogers station was denied largely because it would have replaced some of Talentvision's existing ethnic programming with U.S. syndicated fare. Moreover, Talentvision's existing owner (the company now known as Fairchild Media Group) indicated there was "no plan to abandon [the current Talentvision licence] at this time". As for CanWest, the commission determined that the existence of the CHAN/CHEK twinstick did not justify licensing a new station to a company already serving the market.

The three proposals for an independent station in Vancouver were all determined to be high-calibre. However, the deciding factor in favour of Baton/Electrohome was a commitment to air new Vancouver-produced programming (which ultimately manifested as, among other programs, Gabereau Live!, The Camilla Scott Show, and Cold Squad) across all of Baton's and Electrohome's stations, a promise that the smaller CHUM and Craig station groups could not match. The decision was met with mixed reception in the entertainment community; Baton's large commitment to Canadian programming won praise from the production industry, but others had generally backed the CHUM application, and several people wished the CRTC had awarded multiple stations.

"Vancouver Television"

Construction and planning for CIVT began immediately after the licence award. In March, Baton secured space in a former public library at Robson and Burrard streets; the space had been planned as an arcade, but the proposal was rejected by Vancouver's city council just days before the CRTC decision. Ivan Fecan, the chief executive of Baton, led much of the early planning effort. Fecan had been the former program head of CBC television and a former protégé of Moses Znaimer, founder of CITY-TV, whose format was a major inspiration for the new Vancouver station; in an interview with Maclean's, he described the CIVT format as how City might look "if it was moved from Queen Street to Bloor and Yonge". Znaimer went so far as to claim that Fecan had stolen CITY's format outright for CIVT. In July, channel 9 was assigned as its designation on Lower Mainland cable systems. Occupancy of the Robson and Burrard studios, which were designed by Vancouver firm James Cheng Architects, was granted with only a week to go until launch, with delays owing to waivers needed to place satellite dishes on the heritage building's roof and a strike of city workers that delayed permitting.

For news coverage, Baton had counted on the services of former BCTV news director Cameron Bell in the application phase, and BCTV assignment editor Clive Jackson left after 18 years to join CIVT. As with the rest of the new station's mandate, the newsroom aimed to focus on Vancouver's diversity with an emphasis on the Asian community, which was perceived to not be reflected on the existing Vancouver television stations. New news bureaus were set up in communities around the Lower Mainland and on Vancouver Island—Victoria, North Vancouver, Burnaby, Port Coquitlam, Surrey, and Richmond—staffed with multilingual reporters. Baton seconded programming executive Susanne Boyce to Vancouver to manage the startup of CIVT's non-news programming.

Meanwhile, the impending birth of CIVT was already having an impact on the television industry in Canada. When WIC carried out a round of layoffs in April 1997, analysts ascribed the reasoning to the new competition forthcoming in Vancouver. At the time that the licence was awarded, BCTV bought 18 hours a week of programs from Baton's Baton Broadcast System (BBS) division, consisting of 12 hours of American series and six hours of Canadian productions. These shows, which included Melrose Place, Home Improvement, and The Cosby Show, all moved to CIVT. Baton also owned the Canadian rights to some programs that CKVU aired in the Vancouver market. The entertainment schedule was rounded out by several CTV cast-off shows.

CIVT, branded as Vancouver Television (VTV), began broadcasting on September 22, 1997; the channel had changed from 42 to 32 prior to launch. The station's local programs at launch included a two-hour morning show, Vancouver Breakfast, and Vancouver Live newscasts at noon, 6 p.m., and 11 p.m., as well as Gabereau Live!, a talk show hosted by former local CBC radio personality Vicki Gabereau, and several weekly news and political satire programs, including former CBC Radio staple Double Exposure. Vancouver Breakfast, hosted by Aamer Haleem, Linda Freeman, and radio DJ Ted Schredd, featured a set adorned with chairs and props shaped like strawberries, bacon, and eggs; Alex Strachan of The Vancouver Sun called it "an alarm clock that wouldn't stop ringing". The 6 p.m. Vancouver Live was co-anchored by former MuchMusic VJ Monika Deol.

Baton was making other moves highly pertinent to CIVT's future outside of Vancouver. In 1997, Baton bought Electrohome's broadcasting assets in August, a month before CIVT went on air, in exchange for a 23-percent voting interest. In October, it executed an asset swap with CHUM by which two Ontario stations were sold in exchange for CHUM's CTV-aligned operation in the Maritimes. These deals gave Baton controlling interest in CTV, which had once been structured on a cooperative basis. To complete its ownership, Baton spent $42 million to purchase the CTV shares held by WIC and Moffat Communications, owner of the CTV affiliate in Winnipeg; in 1998, the company renamed itself CTV Inc. BCTV held a continuing affiliation agreement with the CTV network through August 1999, and its CEO promised no near-term changes to the station.

Baton's deals had an impact from the start on VTV. Daryl Duke, an influential Vancouver film director who had previously founded CKVU in 1976 and who had backed the Baton–Electrohome bid because he felt it granted the most local control of any of the five original proposals, resigned in October, claiming the station's advisory board was a legal fiction due to changes in company composition and that he was a "director of hot air". He was joined by another member, Simon Fraser University faculty member Catherine Murray, in resigning. A year on from the launch, analysis of VTV's first year in operation was mixed. Murray criticized VTV as a clone of Citytv where original Canadian shows were consigned to "schedule ghettos" in less-viewed dayparts, and a disillusioned Duke noted that "everything they do locally is noisy pursuit of raucous trivia". Overall station ratings showed little movement from the audience VTV drew at its launch. However, other programs were receiving praise. Despite ratings that trailed even the CBC, a longtime laggard for the Vancouver news audience, Vancouver Live at 6 was named Canada's best newscast by the Radio-Television News Directors Association, and the twelve Gemini Awards nominations for VTV programs exceeded the combined total of some other station groups. Advertisers also welcomed the concomitant increase in inventory brought by the new station. Further, the station scored a coup when it obtained the local telecast rights to Vancouver Canucks hockey, which had been held by BCTV for 27 years, along with Vancouver Grizzlies basketball, beginning in 1998. The noon newscast was dropped, but a 5 p.m. newscast was added.

VTV's early years were marked by turmoil and turnover in on-air personalities and management. Deol left within a year to spend more time with her family. In December 1998, management hired an external candidate for news director, leading to several resignations, including that of Jackson, who returned to BCTV; the move was seen as a blow to morale. Some turnover among news reporters and anchors marked promotions; for instance, Satinder Bindra left VTV to join CNN. News anchor Paul Mennier left for A-Channel Edmonton, in part because of disgust with the continued low ratings; Mi-Jung Lee served as his replacement. In 1999, the newscasts were retitled as VTV News, coinciding with a shuffling of the anchor lineup.

From VTV to CTV

A yearlong dispute between CanWest and Shaw Communications for control of BCTV parent WIC's assets was ended in October 1999 with a deal that saw WIC's television holdings, among them BCTV, go to CanWest. CanWest already owned CKVU, and it was expected to have to sell one of CHAN or CKVU by the CRTC. CTV was said to be interested in possibly acquiring the dominant BCTV. However, CanWest instead announced in February 2000 that it would sell CKVU, the existing Global station. That decision—which set up an affiliation switch to take place in 2001, postponed a year at the CRTC's direction—was immediately understood as making CIVT the new CTV station in British Columbia. It also caused a significant amount of program shuffling between BCTV and VTV for various series to which CTV held the rights.

On September 1, 2001, CIVT-TV became "BC CTV", adopting a format and philosophy more in line with the rest of the CTV network and a name that seemed intended to be similar to BCTV. 

As part of the CTV switch, in lieu of chasing younger viewers, the station would focus more squarely on adults 25–54. Typifying the shift was CIVT securing the services of BCTV news anchors Pamela Martin and Bill Good to anchor the new CTV newscasts. Another impact was that, as CIVT had no over-the-air rebroadcasters in the rest of British Columbia, CTV's reach was diminished and Global's expanded. However, the CRTC authorized many cable providers throughout the province to begin carrying CIVT for the first time, ensuring the continuity of CTV programming on cable in areas where CHAN had previously provided it. After the switch to CTV, CIVT's early evening newscast supplanted that of CKVU-TV as the second-place program in the market.

In 2004, CIVT introduced "Chopper 9", the first full-time news helicopter in Vancouver. In January 2008, CTV began producing a Western Canada edition of Canada AM at the CIVT studios, hosted by Rena Heer; however, due to low ratings, it was cancelled in June of that year. Canada AM continued to air until 2011, when CTV's stations in Western Canada launched local morning newscasts known as CTV Morning Live; a noon newscast was also added at that time. After the 2010 Winter Olympics in Vancouver, portions of CTV's set in the International Broadcast Centre were repurposed to refresh CIVT's newsroom.

On December 7, 2010, Bill Good and Pamela Martin announced their resignation as anchors of the 6:00 p.m. newscast; they cited the decision not to make another long-term commitment in the form of a contract renewal at their ages, with Good cutting back to his radio show on CKNW. Mike Killeen and Tamara Taggart were announced as their replacements the next day and took over as anchors of the broadcast on January 3, 2011. Taggart—who had been at the station since its launch as VTV—and Killeen were let go as the main CTV News Vancouver at Six anchors in April 2018. Mi-Jung Lee and Scott Roberts were named replacement anchors; Roberts was dismissed in 2022, and Lee became the sole anchor for the 6 p.m. program.

CTV Vancouver was the first Canadian television station to win a Edward R. Murrow Award for overall excellence in a large market from the U.S. Radio Television Digital News Association, doing so in 2016.

Notable former on-air staff
 Rob Brown — anchor and reporter
 James Duthie — sportscaster, 1997–1998
 Blake Price — weekend sports anchor (now with sports radio station TSN Radio 1040)
 Jody Vance — sportscaster

Technical information

Subchannel

Analogue-to-digital conversion
CIVT's digital signal began broadcasting in 2005. CIVT shut down its analogue signal, over UHF channel 32, on August 31, 2011, the official date in which Canadian television stations in CRTC-designated mandatory markets transitioned from analogue to digital broadcasts. The station's digital signal relocated from its pre-transition UHF channel 33 to its analogue-era UHF channel 32 for post-transition operations.

References

External links

 

IVT-DT
IVT-DT
Television channels and stations established in 1997
National Hockey League over-the-air television broadcasters
1997 establishments in British Columbia
2010 Winter Olympics